Listed below in chronological order are the Minor League Baseball players chosen by USA Today as recipients of the USA Today Minor League Player of the Year Award. Since 1988, the award has been given annually to the minor-league player who is judged by USA Today baseball experts as having had the most outstanding season. Of the 13 votes cast each year, two votes go to the player selected by fans in online voting at USATODAY.com.

Winners

See also
Baseball America Minor League Player of the Year Award
The Sporting News Minor League Player of the Year Award
Topps Minor League Player of the Year Award
 Minor League Baseball Yearly (MiLBY) Awards (formerly "This Year in Minor League Baseball Awards")

References

USA Today
Minor league baseball trophies and awards
 
Awards by newspapers
Awards established in 1988
1988 establishments in the United States